Vítor Manuel de Oliveira Lopes Pereira (born 26 July 1968) is a Portuguese football manager and former player who played as a midfielder. He currently is the head coach of Campeonato Brasileiro Série A club Flamengo.

Following an amateur playing career, he became manager of Porto, where he won the Primeira Liga in both of his seasons. After leaving in 2013 he worked in several countries, winning a Greek league and cup double with Olympiacos in 2015 and the Chinese Super League with Shanghai SIPG in 2018.

Football career

Early career
Born in Espinho, Pereira only played amateur football, and retired at the age of 28. He started managing at junior level, and his first head coach experience arrived midway through the 2004–05 season, when he was appointed at A.D. Sanjoanense in the third division.

Subsequently, Pereira worked with S.C. Espinho of the same league, being fired with ten games left in his second campaign and returning to FC Porto's juniors for a further season. In 2008 he returned to head coaching again, with C.D. Santa Clara in the Segunda Liga, leading the Azores side to the third position in his first year and the fourth in the second, on both occasions narrowly missing out on Primeira Liga promotion.

Porto
In the summer of 2010, Pereira left Santa Clara to become assistant manager to André Villas-Boas at Porto. On 21 June 2011, following the head coach's departure to Chelsea, he was promoted to first-team manager, winning his first official match – and title – 2–1 against Vitória de Guimarães in the Supertaça Cândido de Oliveira.

Despite a less than stellar performance both in Europe – being knocked out of the UEFA Champions League in the group stage and in the UEFA Europa League's round of 32– and in the Taça de Portugal, Pereira led the club to the league title in his first season in charge. In March 2013, following the team's elimination from Champions League contention (2–1 on aggregate against Málaga CF), he came under heavy criticism, notably due to his decision of benching James Rodríguez during the first half of both legs. The Colombian stated his disappointment in the coach's decision, but said that he respected him and trusted his reasons, adding that the situation was possibly created because of his questionable fitness, even though he claimed to be 100% fit.

In early May 2013, as Porto ranked second in the league, Pereira deemed the Portuguese league as a "dirty competition". Only a few days later, after his team defeated S.L. Benfica at home to surpass its opponents – eventually winning the league title, conceding six draws in 30 games– he considered it to be a "highly competitive and prestigious league".

Five clubs in eight years

In late May 2013, Pereira was interviewed for the vacant job at Premier League club Everton, but eventually signed a two-year deal with Al Ahli Saudi FC of the Saudi Professional League. On 7 January 2015 he moved countries again, replacing the fired Míchel at the helm of Olympiacos F.C. and eventually winning the double.

On 10 June 2015, Olympiacos announced a mutual contract termination with Pereira. The following day, he was appointed at Fenerbahçe S.K. for two years.

The Turkish side cut ties unilaterally with Pereira on 15 August 2016, with the case being subsequently taken to the Court of Arbitration for Sport. On 18 December he was named head coach of TSV 1860 Munich in the German 2. Bundesliga, with the one-and-a-half-year deal being made effective the following 1 January. The team finished the season third from bottom, and eventually got relegated on 30 May 2017 after a 3–1 loss aggregate loss to SSV Jahn Regensburg in the play-offs.

Pereira became the manager of Shanghai SIPG F.C. on 12 December 2017, replacing Villas-Boas at the Chinese Super League club. In his debut campaign, he guided them to their first-ever title in the competition. In December 2019 he turned down a new approach from Everton and, one year later, left Shanghai.

Pereira returned to Fenerbahçe on 2 July 2021, on a two-year contract. He was sacked on 20 December after a 2–2 home draw with Istanbul rivals Beşiktaş JK; his side were in fifth position and 14 points behind leaders Trabzonspor. A month later, he was again linked with Everton as owner Farhad Moshiri's lead candidate, prompting anger and vandalism from fans who saw him as inadequate and wanted eventual appointee Frank Lampard instead; he defended his reputation in an interview on Sky Sports News.

Corinthians

On 23 February 2022, Pereira was announced as head coach of Campeonato Brasileiro Série A club Sport Club Corinthians Paulista, signing until the end of the year. He lost to an opening-minute goal away to rivals São Paulo FC on his Campeonato Paulista debut a week later, and the state championship ended with a 2–1 semi-final loss to the same opponents.

On 13 November 2022, just hours after the last match of the season, it was announced that Pereira would not renew his contract. He said in a social media post that he had to return home due to his mother-in-law's health.

Flamengo
Shortly after leaving Corinthians, Pereira was appointed at CR Flamengo also of the Brazilian top flight. On 28 January 2023, his team lost the Supercopa do Brasil 4–3 to Sociedade Esportiva Palmeiras. His second defeat took place on 7 February, 3–2 against Al Hilal SFC in the semi-finals of the FIFA Club World Cup after playing the entire second half with one player less. Later that month, they were beaten on penalties by Ecuador's C.S.D. Independiente del Valle in the Recopa Sudamericana (1–1 over two legs).

Managerial statistics

Honours

Porto
Primeira Liga: 2011–12, 2012–13
Supertaça Cândido de Oliveira: 2011, 2012
Taça da Liga runner-up: 2012–13
UEFA Super Cup runner-up: 2011

Al-Ahli
King Cup of Champions runner-up: 2014

Olympiacos
Super League Greece: 2014–15
Greek Football Cup: 2014–15

Shanghai SIPG
Chinese Super League: 2018
Chinese FA Super Cup: 2019

References

External links

1968 births
Living people
People from Espinho, Portugal
Sportspeople from Aveiro District
Portuguese footballers
Association football midfielders
U.D. Oliveirense players
C.D. Estarreja players
SC São João de Ver players
Portuguese football managers
Primeira Liga managers
Liga Portugal 2 managers
C.D. Santa Clara managers
FC Porto managers
Saudi Professional League managers
Al-Ahli Saudi FC managers
Super League Greece managers
Olympiacos F.C. managers
Süper Lig managers
Fenerbahçe football managers
2. Bundesliga managers
TSV 1860 Munich managers
Chinese Super League managers
Shanghai Port F.C. managers
Campeonato Brasileiro Série A managers
Sport Club Corinthians Paulista managers
CR Flamengo managers
Portuguese expatriate football managers
Expatriate football managers in Saudi Arabia
Expatriate football managers in Greece
Expatriate football managers in Turkey
Expatriate football managers in Germany
Expatriate football managers in China
Expatriate football managers in Brazil
Portuguese expatriate sportspeople in Saudi Arabia
Portuguese expatriate sportspeople in Greece
Portuguese expatriate sportspeople in Turkey
Portuguese expatriate sportspeople in Germany
Portuguese expatriate sportspeople in China
Portuguese expatriate sportspeople in Brazil